KIFG-FM (95.3  FM)  is a commercial radio station serving the Iowa Falls, Iowa area.  The station primarily broadcasts a classic hits format.  KIFG-FM is licensed to Times-Citizen Communications, Inc which is owned by Mark H. Hamilton, Carie Goodknight and Josh Lovelace.

The transmitter and broadcast tower are located 2 miles east of Iowa Falls along 130th Street. The tower is shared with its AM sister station KIFG (AM).

The station is an affiliate of the syndicated Pink Floyd program "Floydian Slip."

History
On June 30, 2010, KIFG-FM changed their format from adult contemporary to classic hits.

References

External links
KIFG website

IFG